Comolia is a genus of flowering plants belonging to the family Melastomataceae.

Its native range is Trinidad to Southern Tropical America.

Species:

Comolia anomala 
Comolia berberifolia 
Comolia bracteosa 
Comolia latifolia 
Comolia leptophylla 
Comolia microphylla 
Comolia nummularioides 
Comolia ovalifolia 
Comolia prostrata 
Comolia serpyllacea 
Comolia smithii 
Comolia vernicosa 
Comolia villosa

References

Melastomataceae
Melastomataceae genera
Taxa named by Augustin Pyramus de Candolle
Taxa described in 1828